King's Faith is a 2013 American drama film directed by Nicholas DiBella.

Cast 
Crawford Wilson as Brendan King
Lynn Whitfield as Vanessa Stubbs
James McDaniel as Mike Stubbs

References

External links 

American drama films
2013 drama films
2013 films
2010s English-language films
2010s American films